The gaster is the bulbous posterior portion of the metasoma found in hymenopterans of the suborder Apocrita (bees, wasps and ants).  This begins with abdominal segment III on most ants, but some make a constricted  postpetiole out of segment III, in which case the gaster begins with abdominal segment IV.

Certain ants in the genus Cataglyphis, specifically Cataglyphis bicolor and Cataglyphis fortis, have a cubiform petiole that allows them to decrease their inertia (and therefore increase their speed) by raising their gaster into an upright position.

References 

Insect anatomy

de:Gaster